Jafar ibn Yahya Barmaki, Jafar al-Barmaki (Jafar bin yaḥyā) (767–803) also called Aba-Fadl, was a Persian vizier of the Abbasid caliph Harun al-Rashid, succeeding his father (Yahya ibn Khalid) in that position. He was a member of the influential Barmakid family, formerly Buddhist leaders of the Nava Vihara monastery. He was executed in 803 at the orders of Harun al-Rashid.

He had a reputation as a patron of the sciences, and did much to introduce Indian science into Baghdad. He was credited with convincing the caliph to open a paper mill in Baghdad, the secret of papermaking having been obtained from Tang Chinese prisoners at the Battle of Talas (in present-day Kyrgyzstan) in 751.

In fiction
Jafar also appears (under the name of Giafar in most translations) along with Harun al-Rashid in several Arabian Nights tales, often acting as a protagonist. In "The Three Apples" for example, Jafar is tasked with solving a murder, whereas in "The Tale of Attaf", Jafar is more of an adventurer.

More recent media inspired by the Arabian Nights has portrayed Jafar as both a villain and a sorcerer:
 In the 1940 version of The Thief of Bagdad, Conrad Veidt plays the grand vizier Jaffar, a sorcerer who overthrows the king and tries to seduce the princess.
 In the film The Golden Blade (1952), Harun al-Rashid (Rock Hudson) battles Jafar (George Macready), vizier to the caliph of Baghdad who tries to usurp the throne.
In the book The Grand Vizier of the Night (1981) by Catherine Hermary-Vieille, he is the Caliph Harun al-Rashid's lover.
 In 1989 the video game Prince of Persia featured a scheming magician named Jaffar who seized power from the Sultan and tried to force the Princess to marry him. In the later Prince of Persia games, an unnamed 'Vizier' is the main villain and is based on the Jaffar character from the original game.
 In 1992 the Disney film Aladdin featured an evil vizier and sorcerer called Jafar, who is a composite character of an (unnamed) vizier and an evil magician from the original Aladdin tale.
 In the Japanese manga of Magi: The Labyrinth of Magic, Jafar is a young general working under Sinbad, the king of Sindria.

Family tree

See also
Islamic Golden Age
Islamic literature

References

External links
How Greek Science passed to the Arabs, with some references to Jafar

767 births
803 deaths
One Thousand and One Nights characters
Barmakids
9th-century executions by the Abbasid Caliphate
8th-century Iranian people
9th-century Iranian people
8th-century people from the Abbasid Caliphate
9th-century people from the Abbasid Caliphate
Viziers of the Abbasid Caliphate